Isogona texana is a species of moth of the family Erebidae. It is found in Texas.

The wingspan is about 24 mm.

External links
Images
Bug Guide

Boletobiinae